The 2nd constituency of the Yonne is a French legislative constituency in the Yonne département.

Description

Yonne's 2nd Constituency covers the east of the department and includes the famous vineyards of Chablis along with many other small towns and villages. The most substantial of which is Avallon in the south east of the constituency.

Historic Representation

Election results

2022

 
 
|-
| colspan="8" bgcolor="#E9E9E9"|
|-
 
 

 
 
 
 
 

* André Villiers stood for UDI, as part of the UDC alliance, in 2017. He joined Horizons, part of the Ensemble coalition, in 2022. The swing is calculated against the LREM candidate from 2017, as LREM is also part of the Ensemble alliance.

2017

 
 
 
 
 
 
 
 
|-
| colspan="8" bgcolor="#E9E9E9"|
|-

2012

 
 
 
 
 
 
|-
| colspan="8" bgcolor="#E9E9E9"|
|-

2007

 
 
 
 
 
 
 
|-
| colspan="8" bgcolor="#E9E9E9"|
|-

2002

 
 
 
 
 
 
|-
| colspan="8" bgcolor="#E9E9E9"|
|-

1997

 
 
 
 
 
 
 
 
|-
| colspan="8" bgcolor="#E9E9E9"|
|-

Sources
Official results of French elections from 2002: "Résultats électoraux officiels en France" (in French).

2